The National Science Bowl (NSB) is a high school and middle school science knowledge competition, using a quiz bowl format, held in the United States. A buzzer system similar to those seen on popular television game shows is used to signal an answer. The competition has been organized and sponsored by the United States Department of Energy since its inception in 1991.

Subject areas
Questions are asked in the categories of Biology, Chemistry, Earth and Space Science, Energy (dealing with DOE research), Mathematics, and Physics.

Several categories have been added, dropped, or merged throughout the years. Computer Science was dropped from the list in late 2002. Current Events was in the 2005 competition, but did not make a return. General Science was dropped and Astronomy was merged with Earth Science to create Earth and Space Science in 2011.

Regional competitions
The winning team of each regional Science Bowl competition is invited to participate in the National Science Bowl finals in Washington, D.C., with all expenses paid. As of 2018, there were 65 high school regionals and 48 middle school regionals. These figures include the two "super regional" sites that are permitted to send two teams to the national competition. The two super regionals are the Kansas/Missouri Regional High School Science Bowl and the Connecticut/Northeast Regional High School Science Bowl (The Northeast Regional includes Rhode Island, Connecticut, Massachusetts, New Hampshire, Vermont, and parts of New York).

Typically, any school that meets the eligibility requirements of the National Science Bowl is permitted to register for its regional competition according to its geographic location. No school may compete in multiple regionals. In addition, most regional competitions permit schools to register up to three teams. Since 2017, club teams are no longer able to compete.

Rules and guidelines of the national competition
This section is concerned with the rules of the national competition. The rules of regional competitions vary greatly. There are very few prescribed rules for regional competitions. Some regionals are run nearly identically to the national competition, while others use variations of the rules or different methods of scoring.

General rules
A team consists of 4 or 5 students from a single school. Only 4 students play at any one time, while the 5th is designated as the alternate. Substitutions and switching captains may occur at halftime and between rounds.

Two teams compete against each other in each match. Each team member is given a number A1, A Captain, A2, A3, B1, B Captain, B2, B3, according to the position each student sits in. In regional competitions, each round consists of 23 questions (that is, 23 toss-ups and 23 corresponding bonuses). At the National Finals, each round consists of 25 questions. The match is over when all the toss-up questions have been read (and any bonuses related to correctly answered toss-ups), or after two halves have elapsed, whichever occurs first. The team with the most points at this time is the winner. At the regional level, all matches consist of two 8-minute halves, separated by a 2-minute break.  At the national level for middle schools, all matches consist of two 10-minute halves.  For high schools, all round robin and some double elimination matches consist of two 10-minute halves, with the final rounds consisting of two 12-minute halves to accommodate the longer visual bonus questions.

Toss-ups
Every match begins with a toss-up question. The moderator announces the subject of the question (see "Subject Areas" above), as well as its type (Multiple Choice or Short Answer). Once the moderator completes the reading of the question, students have 5 seconds to buzz in and give an answer. Students may buzz in at any time after the category has been read—there is no need to wait for the moderator to finish. However, there is a penalty for interrupting the moderator and giving an incorrect answer. Once a student from a team has buzzed in, that team may not buzz in again on that question. Conferring between members of a team is not allowed on toss-up questions; if conferring occurs on a question, the team is disallowed from answering that question. The rules regarding conferring are typically very strict: excessive noise, eye contact, or even noticeable shifts in position can be considered conferring, as they convey information to teammates.

An answer given by a student is ruled correct or incorrect by the moderator. On short answer questions, if the answer given differs from the official one, the moderator uses his or her judgment to make a ruling (which is subject to a challenge by the competitors). On multiple choice questions, the answer given by the student is only correct if it matches the official answer exactly. Alternatively, the student may give the letter choice that corresponds to the correct answer. Although A, B, C, and D were once used as answer choice letters, W, X, Y, and Z are now favored due to a lower chance of confusion. On short answers, the answer does not have to exactly match the official answer, so any given answer that roughly means the same as the official answer is accepted.

Bonuses
If a student answers a toss-up question correctly, that student's team receives a bonus question. The bonus question is always in the same category as the corresponding toss-up question, though it may not always relate to the toss-up question. Since only that team has the opportunity to answer the bonus question, there is no need to buzz in to answer it. After the moderator finishes reading the question, the team has 20 seconds to answer. The timekeeper will give a 5-second warning when 5 seconds remain. Conferring between team members is permitted, but the team captain must give the team's final answer.

Visual bonuses were introduced in 2003. They are only included in the final elimination rounds. The team has 30 seconds to answer a question with the aid of a visual displayed on a 19-inch monitor (for the final matches) or on a distributed worksheet (for earlier elimination matches).

The same rules apply to the judging of responses to bonus questions as apply to responses to toss-up questions. Once the team's answer has been ruled right or wrong, the moderator proceeds to the next toss-up question.

If neither team answers the toss-up question correctly, the bonus question is not read, and the moderator proceeds to the next toss-up question.

Scoring
Correct responses to toss-up questions are worth 4 points each.  If a student buzzes in on a toss-up question before the moderator has completely read the question (i.e., interrupts the moderator) and responds "incorrectly", 4 points are awarded to the opposing team, and the question is re-read in its entirety so that the opposing team has an opportunity to buzz in.

A correct response on a bonus question earns 10 points, making the total possible score on a single question 18 points (4 for a correct answer, 4 penalty points, and 10 for the bonus), and a perfect score 450 points. Against a team which never buzzes in (often the better approximation), the maximum (perfect) score is 350 points. This is assuming that only the regular 25 questions have been answered. Earning more than 200 points in one game is very impressive and earning more than 300 points is extremely rare.

Penalties 
There are various different types of penalties given. If a player interrupts and answers incorrectly or without being recognized (saying their team name and number out loud), four penalty points are awarded to the opposing team. Communication among team members during a toss-up before a buzz incurs no point penalty, but disqualifies that team from answering the question, although communication amongst team members for toss up questions was permitted in 2021. If communication occurs after a team member buzzes in, it is considered a blurt. As of 2023, blurts do not incur a point penalty unless the player interrupted.

If the team that is no longer able to answer the toss-up engages in distracting behavior, then the opposing team is awarded four points, the opportunity to answer the corresponding bonus, and the option of running 20 additional seconds off the game clock. Similarly, if the team not playing the bonus engages in distracting behavior, then the opposing team is awarded ten points and the option of running 40 additional seconds off the game clock.

Challenges
Challenges must be made before the moderator begins reading the next question, or 3 seconds after the last question of the half or game. The question officially begins after its subject area has been read. Only the 4 actively competing members may challenge. The fifth team member, coach, and others associated with a team may not become involved in challenges or their discussion. However, beginning in 2020, anyone in the competition room can make the officials aware of scoring or clock management errors, these are known as corrections rather than challenges.

Challenges may be made either to scientific content or the administration of rules. They may not be made to judgment calls by the officials, such as whether a buzz was an interrupt, whether 20 seconds have passed before beginning to answer a bonus, or whether a stall or blurt has happened. Challenges to scientific content is limited to 2 unsuccessful challenges per round. Successful challenges do not count against this limit. Each team has unlimited challenges to administration of rules.

Competition format
This section is concerned with the format of the national competition only. As is the case with competition rules, the competition format varies greatly among the different regional competitions.

Regionals typically use round robin, single-elimination, double-elimination, or any combination of these formats.

The national competition always consists of two stages: round-robin and double-elimination.

Round-robin
All competing teams are randomly arranged (each team captain randomly picks a division and position on the first day of the National Finals) into eight round-robin groups of eight or nine teams each for high school and six teams each for middle school. Every team plays every other team in its group once, receiving 2 points for a win, 1 point for a tie, or 0 points for a loss. If a team's opponent has not arrived, that team can practice instead. The rules still apply, though any win or loss is not counted. In previous years, the top two teams from each group advanced to the double-elimination stage. Starting in 2020, four teams from each group will advance.

Tiebreaks
In the event that two or more teams are tied for one of the top spots in a division, the result of the Division Team Challenge (DTC) is used as a tiebreak. This method is only used for high schools.

In previous rules, there were several tiebreak procedures, applied in the following order:
 The head-to-head record of all the tied teams is compared. The team(s) with the best record against the other tied teams win(s) the tiebreak.
 The team(s) with the fewest losses win(s) the tiebreak.
 The result of the Division Team Challenge (DTC) is used.  The DTC is a lab-based activity where team members worked together to solve a challenge using the materials provided. The activity varies among the divisions.

In years before that, there was no DTC, so the following procedure was used in its place:
 If more than two teams are still tied, each team is placed in a separate room and is read five toss-up questions. Each team's score is determined by the number of questions answered correctly minus the number answered incorrectly. The team(s) with the highest score(s) win(s) the tiebreak.
 If two teams are still tied, the two teams compete head-to-head, receiving five toss-up questions at 4 points for each correct answer (no bonus questions are used). All the usual toss-up rules are in effect, including the interrupt penalty. The team with the higher score wins the tiebreak.

If a tie still existed after this procedure, it is reapplied until the tie is resolved.  These last rules are still used for the Middle School competition.

Single/Double-elimination
Starting in 2020, 32 teams advance to the double elimination stage. Prior to 2020, approximately 16 teams advanced from the round-robin (depending on the number of round robin groups). In 2004 and 2007, exactly 16 teams advanced, while in 2003 and 2002, 18 teams advanced. In 2006, the teams were seeded into a single-elimination tournament based on their preliminary round-robin results. In previous years, a team's position in the double-elimination tournament was determined by random draw; teams were not seeded in any way. The competition then proceeded (in 2006) like a typical single-elimination tournament. Seeding continued in the 2007 tournament: teams that won their pool were paired against teams that placed second in theirs. Unlike in the round-robin, a match in double-elimination cannot be tied. If a match is tied at the end of regulation, overtime periods of five toss-ups each are played until the tie is broken.

The elimination tournament produces a first-place, second-place, third-place, and fourth-place team. Except for the 2006 tournament, a double-elimination tournament format has been used, allowing a fifth place to be added. The tournament reverted to a double-elimination format for the 2007 tournament, without a fifth-place match.

Prizes

The top two high school teams receive trips to one of the National Parks, all-expenses paid.

The top three middle and high school teams receive a trophy, individual medals, and photographs with officials of the Department of Energy.

The top 16 middle and high schools earn a check for their school's science departments. As of 2020, the top 16 schools receive $1,000, the top 8 schools receive $1,500, the top 4 schools receive $2,000, and the top 2 schools receive $2,500.

Each team with the best Division Team Challenge result in their division earns a $500 check for their school's science department.

Car competition
For the middle school teams, the DOE also sponsored a car competition challenging competitors to construct a car capable of attaining high speeds. They are powered through alternative energy sources such as hydrogen fuel cells and solar panels. The winners of the car competition were awarded with $500 for their school.

Results of the national competition

High school

The winning teams from the years 1991-2001 were

 2001 (61 teams) North Hollywood High School (North Hollywood, California)
 2000 (60 teams) duPont Manual High School (Louisville, Kentucky)
 1999 (53 teams) Montgomery Blair High School (Silver Spring, Maryland)
 1998 (48 teams) Valley High School (West Des Moines, Iowa)
 1997 (45 teams) Venice High School (Los Angeles, California)
 1996 (53 teams) Venice High School (Los Angeles, California)
 1995 (55 teams) Van Nuys High School (Van Nuys, California)
 1994 (51 teams) The Westminster Schools (Atlanta, Georgia)
 1993 (43 teams) Albany High School (Albany, California)
 1992 (29 teams) Lubbock High School (Lubbock, Texas)
 1991 (18 teams) Lubbock High School (Lubbock, Texas)

Middle school

See also
 Quiz Bowl
 National Middle School Science Bowl

Notes

References

External links

 Official National Science Bowl Website
 United States Department of Energy

Student quiz competitions
Science competitions
United States Department of Energy
Science events in the United States
Recurring events established in 1991
1991 establishments in the United States